Left Handed Johnny West (also known just as Johnny West) is a 1965 Italian Spaghetti Western film  directed by Gianfranco Parolini.

Plot    
Johnny West is a half-breed and a dreaded shooter. In the village where he comes, two brothers spread fear and terror with a group of unscrupulous men. So they have a goldmine owner in their power and try to become heir of his assets. Even with Johnny West they are doing a bad game, so that he is put in jail instead of them for bank robbery. However, he can break out and decimate the bandits with the help of two dealers. Then he captures the two brothers, shoots them and returns the stolen money to the owners. He then rides on new adventures.

Cast
Mimmo Palmara as Jonny West (as Dick Palmer)
Adriano Micantoni as Jefferson (as Mike Anthony)
Roger Delaporte as Don Trent
André Bollet as Brad McCoy
Mara Cruz as Anne Rose
Dada Gallotti as Ginger (as Diana Garsón)
Barta Barri
Roberto Camardiel as Dusty
Bob Felton	as Jimmy

References

External links
 

1965 films
1960s Italian-language films
Films directed by Gianfranco Parolini
Spaghetti Western films
Italian Western (genre) films
1965 Western (genre) films
Films shot in Almería
Films scored by Angelo Francesco Lavagnino
1960s Italian films